The 1957 All England Championships was a badminton tournament held at Wembley, London, England, from 20–25 March 1957.

This was the first year in which the competition switched to Wembley from Earls Court. Kirsten Thorndahl married and played under the name Kirsten Granlund.

Final results

Results

Men's singles

Section 1

Section 2

Women's singles

Section 1

Section 2

References

All England Open Badminton Championships
All England Badminton Championships
All England Open Badminton Championships in London
All England Championships
All England Badminton Championships
All England Badminton Championships